The M53 is an  motorway in the Metropolitan Borough of Wirral and Cheshire on the Wirral Peninsula in England. It is also referred to as the Mid Wirral Motorway. It runs between the Kingsway Tunnel, at Wallasey in the north, and the A55 at Chester.

The main reason for the motorway was to provide a through route to the new Mersey Road Tunnel, Kingsway, which was built at the same time. Part of this motorway was originally the M531.

Route

Starting at the northern end, the motorway starts in Wallasey at the exit slip roads from the Kingsway Tunnel from Liverpool. It loops round the north west of Birkenhead and then runs south as a dual three-lane route between Upton, Woodchurch in the west and Prenton. From junctions 1 to 3 it runs parallel to the Borderlands railway line. It crosses this line south of junction 3. At junction 5, traffic for Wales can take the A41, A550 and A494 to join the A55 near Ewloe. The road passes north and then east of Hooton, then to the east of Overpool and Wolverham and with Ellesmere Port to the west.

South of junction 10 the route enters a more rural setting, passing under the M56 motorway at junction 11. Finally, it heads south and becomes the A55 North Wales Expressway at junction 12.

History
This motorway was originally two separate projects, the M53 and M531. The M53 was originally proposed to run from the Kingsway Tunnel to Backford. The M531 would have run from between the current junctions 4 & 5 and provided a connection with the M56 for eastbound travel.

When the M53 was first planned in the early 1960s, it was designed as a route to connect the two Mersey road tunnels with the A55 trunk road on the Welsh border, giving Liverpool and the rest of Merseyside a direct link with Chester and the towns on the North Wales coast.

In the event, the A55 link was never built and instead the M531 (by-passing the eastern side of Chester) was incorporated into the M53.

M531
The first section of the M531 was built to improve access to the Vauxhall Ellesmere Port facility.  It was opened in 1968 as a non-designated road. Subsequently this road was extended further south to meet the A5117 and was designated as the M531. In March 1981, the M531 was lengthened to meet the M56 and at this stage the whole route was redesignated as the M53.

M53
Construction on the M53 started in 1969. It was to be built in stages as part of a strategic route to North Wales for traffic from Merseyside. The route to North Wales was unresolved as there was even an option to run due west from south of junction 4 and cross the River Dee on a barrage. This first section from the tunnel to junction 5, where it connected straight into the Vauxhall Motors road, was opened by Lord Leverhulme in a ceremony at Hooton on 1 February 1972. The unbuilt motorway would have provided a bypass of the A41 and would likely have terminated on the M56, though exactly where is unknown. The unfinished junction for this extension has now been demolished.

The final section of the M53 provided a link to Chester from the M56 and was opened in 1982. No plans are known to exist to complete the originally planned M53.

Dates
 Junctions 1 to 5 were opened in 1972
 Junctions 5 to 8 were redesignated as motorway in 1974 as part of the M531
 Junctions 8 to 10 opened in 1975 as part of the M531
 Junctions 10 to 11 were opened in 1981
 Junctions 11 to 12 were opened in 1982

Junctions

{| border=1 cellpadding=2 style="margin-left:1em; margin-bottom: 1em; color: black; border-collapse: collapse; font-size: 100%;" class="wikitable"
|- align="center" bgcolor="#0079C1" style="color: white;font-size:120%;"
| colspan="6" | M53 motorway junctions
|- align="center" bgcolor="000000" style="color: white"
| mile
| km
| Northbound exits (B carriageway)
| Junction
| Southbound exits (A carriageway)
|- style="text-align:center;"
|0.0
|0.0
| End of motorway Road continues as Wallasey Tunnel towards Liverpool
| rowspan=3| J1
| Birkenhead, New Brighton, Wallasey A5139 (A554)Non-motorway traffic
|- align='center'
|
|
| Birkenhead  A5139
| Start of motorway 
|- align='center'
|
|
| Wallasey, Birkenhead A554
| 
|- style="text-align:center;"
|6.5
|10.5
| Hoylake, West Kirby (A551)
| J2
| Hoylake, West Kirby (A551)
|- align='center'
|8.6
|13.8
| Birkenhead A552
| J3
| Birkenhead, Heswall A552
|- align='center'
|11.7
|18.8
| Clatterbridge, Heswall, Bebington A5137
| J4
| Bebington, Bromborough, Clatterbridge, Neston A5137
|- align='center'
|15.8
|25.4
| Birkenhead, Queensferry A41
| J5
| NORTH WALES, Queensferry, Eastham A41
|- align='center'
|rowspan=2 | 16.2
|rowspan=2 | 26.1
| style=background:skyblue | Entering Merseyside
|rowspan=2 |  J6
| Vauxhall (Cars Only), Eastham Oil Terminal
|- align='center'
| Vauxhall (Cars Only), Eastham Oil Terminal
| style=background:skyblue | Entering Cheshire
|- align='center'
|17.5
|28.2
| Overpool, Whitby, North Road Industrial Estate B5132
| J7
| Overpool, Whitby, North Road Industrial Estate B5132
|- align='center'
|18.3
|29.5
| Netherpool and Rossmore Industrial Estates, Docks
| J8
| Netherpool and Rossmore Industrial Estates, Docks
|- align='center'
|19.1
|30.7
| Ellesmere Port (Centre), Boat Museum A5032
| J9
| Ellesmere Port (Centre), Stanlow, Boat Museum A5032
|- align='center'
|20.9
|33.7
| Queensferry, Stanlow A5117
| J10
| Queensferry, Stanlow A5117
|- align='center'
|21.6
|34.8
| Runcorn, Liverpool , Warrington, (M6),
Manchester M56
| J11
| Runcorn, Warrington, (M6), Manchester M56
|- align='center'
|24.5
|39.5
| Start of motorway 
| rowspan=2|J12
| Chester A56
|- align='center'
|24.9
|40.1
| Chester, Helsby A56Non-motorway traffic
| End of motorway Road continues as A55 towards North Wales
|-
! colspan=5 | Moreton Spur
|- style="text-align:center;"
|
|
| End of motorway West Kirby A551 (B5139)Moreton A551, Hoylake (A553)
| rowspan=2 | J2A
| Moreton A551, Hoylake (A553)
|- align='center'
|
|
| Upton A551
| Start of motorway(Moreton Spur) 
Data from driver location signs is used to provide distance and carriageway identifier information.

Notes

Traffic counts

M53 Divide
The M53 is seen as an east–west divide between the affluent and developing areas of the Wirral.

Culture
A full-sized replica of one of the motorway's bridges forms part of the exhibition O' Magic Power of Bleakness by Mark Leckey at Tate Britain (September 2019 – January 2020).

See also

 List of motorways in the United Kingdom
 Wirral Line
 A41 road

References

Further reading

External links

 CBRD Motorway Database – M53/531
 Legislation.gov.uk - M53
 Pathetic Motorways –  M531
 The Motorway Archive – M53
 Vol. 4 M53/A55 Wallasey Tunnel to A5104/A55 Junction at Broughton North Wales. List of material held in the Cheshire County Council Record Office - The Motorway Archive

5-0053
5-0053
5-0053